Oncopeltus fasciatus, known as the large milkweed bug, is a medium-sized hemipteran (true bug) of the family Lygaeidae. It is distributed throughout North America, from Central America through Mexico and the Caribbean to southern areas in Canada. Costa Rica represents this insect's southern limit. It inhabits disturbed areas, roadsides, and open pastures. Due to this widespread geographic distribution, this insect exhibits varying life history trade-offs depending on the population location, including differences in wing length and other traits based on location.

Identification 
Adults can range from 11 to 12 mm in length and have a red/orange and black X-shaped  pattern on their wings underneath the triangle that is typical to hemipterans. This feature makes the bug easily seen, acting as an aposematic warning to predators of distastefulness. O. fasciatus exhibits Müllerian mimicry and is noxious to predators. The ventral side of the fourth abdominal segment bears a black band in the male and two black spots in the female. Juveniles are born mostly red with black antennae and a few black spots, throughout growth the black spots are developed as well as wing pads. Eggs of this insect are bright orange and easily detectable.

Life cycle 

This large milkweed bug is a hemimetabolous insect, meaning it grows in stages called instars and goes through incomplete metamorphosis, exhibiting small changes throughout development such as coloration changes, development of wings and genitalia. O. fasciatus begins as an egg and experiences four nymphal stages over 28–30 days before moulting to adulthood. Females become sexually receptive within a few days of adulthood. Geographic location has a large effect on egg production rate and clutch size, although the intrinsic increase in reproduction depends on to what the individual is acclimated. For example, two close populations (60 km apart) residing on a sharp incline have differing optimal reproduction temperatures, where the cooler (higher) adapted population is at 23 °C and the warmer (lower) population is adapted to 27 °C. Highest clutch size occurs in Puerto Rico, Florida, and Texas populations at 30-50 eggs per clutch. Lowest clutch size was found in California at 25-30 eggs per clutch. Iowa and Maryland (northern populations) exhibited a clutch size in between the two extremes from 25 to 35 eggs per clutch.                                            

In favourable conditions (tropics) reproduction occurs continuously all year round, in less-favourable conditions (temperate zones) reproduction occurs during the warmer months. Reproducing when migrants arrive introduces gene flow between northern and southern populations, this provides an advantage to the midrange populations (variable climates) because females then can ensure genetic variability. The milkweed bug can produce from one to three generations per year depending on climate and geographic location. O. fasciatus exhibits strong selection for survival and will halt reproduction as a trade-off if conditions are not ideal.

Diapause occurs on short days and on cold days in temperate regions and occasionally occurs during dry season in tropical regions. Most populations of the milkweed bug overwinter, usually after migration to their overwintering sites due to environmental triggers such as temperature and photoperiod. However, photoperiod only predicts overwintering in areas where day length affects the maturation of milkweeds. Therefore, no overwintering occurs in tropical regions, as it does not supply an adaptive advantage.

Migration 

O. fasciatus can be separated into migrators and nonmigrators. Palmer and Dingle showed that northern populations such as the one in Iowa show the greatest tendency for long-distance flight and are highly migratory. Oppositely, southern populations such as those in Puerto Rico show the lowest tendency and are sedentary. South populations grow seasonally as migrants first appear in late spring and mid-summer. A migratory syndrome has been described in the northern population, meaning that traits such as wing length, fecundity, developmental time and flight duration are all genetically correlated. Groeters and Dingle suggested that selection is specific to the populations environment due to the small correlations between life-history strategies across geographic ranges. A trade-off between migration and life history traits may be the causation of such a wide geological distribution. Attisano suggested that genetic factors as well as environmental cues trigger migration in some individuals. Since long duration flights decrease with decreasing latitude, temperature is a strong factor influencing the migration. Also, this movement correlates with flowering of milkweeds which provides further evidence that environmental triggers relate to migration. Larger females are thought to allocate resources to migration simply because they have more to spare. Smaller individuals are thought to deploy alternative mechanisms; one being the reabsorption of oocytes for energy. The fact that these insects return to northern environments after migration could be the influence of a genetic predisposition or selected for due to crowding and increased intraspecific competition for resources in the southern areas.

Tropical populations migrate shorter distances than temperate populations because spatial variation of their choice host is much greater, so it is advantageous to seek new plant congregations rather than tolerate the depletion of resources.

Diet 

O. fasciatus is a specialist herbivore that frequently consumes common milkweed seeds, Asclepias syriaca Apocynaceae. This bug also feeds on A. nivea, Sarcostemma clausa, Calotropis procera, and Nerium oleander. The southern populations often consume Asclepias curassavica, a tropical milkweed. When given sunflower seeds in a laboratory, this bug obtained 90% of their lipids, 50% of their protein and 20% of their carbohydrates, making it an efficient feeder. Toxic compounds in milkweeds are also sequestered, giving this insect its toxicity.

Adults wander during the daytime in search of food since milkweeds live in patches that can vary in size and distance apart from one another. When a follicle is found, they inject saliva into it through their long rostrums, this pre-digests the seed and allows O. fasciatus to suck it up through their anterior pump and pharynx. Often, multiple individuals feed on one follicle, suggesting that a signal is released by feeding individuals that indicates a good food source. It has been shown that adults are more likely to find a food source when another adult is already feeding on it, further supporting the signaling concept. Occasionally, females are seen feeding on shedding exoskeletons from moulting individuals. Rarely, cannibalization is observed in laboratory settings.

Juveniles of O. fasciatus require the seed of milkweed plants for development and growth. Adults can survive on other types of seeds, such as sunflower, watermelon, almond, and cashew, as shown in lab populations. Nymphs live in large groups of about 20 individuals on the plant. Juveniles have an advantageous, discontinuous, three-part gut that acts similarly to a crop, ventriculus, and ileum, but they  lack definitive parts. During the final instar of development, oil accumulates to allow for more efficient absorption of nutrients and aid in osmoregulation.

Laboratory use 
The phylogenetic placement of O. fasciatus is ideal to use as an outgroup to make comparisons to more derived holometabolous insects, acting as a valuable organism for the study of evolutionary patterns.

References

Migratory behavior Roy L. Caldwell Mary Ann Rankin. Journal of comparative physiology. Separation of migratory from feeding and reproductive behavior in Oncopeltus fasciatus

Lygaeidae
Hemiptera of North America
Insects described in 1852